Manorama Pandey is an Indian politician . She was a Member of Parliament, representing Bihar in the Rajya Sabha the upper house of India's Parliament as a member of the Indian National Congress.

References

1932 births
Living people
Rajya Sabha members from Bihar
Indian National Congress politicians from Bihar
Women in Bihar politics
Women members of the Rajya Sabha